Alexander David González Sibulo (born 13 September 1992) is a Venezuelan footballer who plays for Caracas in the Venezuelan Primera División and the Venezuela national football team. Mainly a right back, he can also play as a right winger.

Career

Caracas
Born in Caracas, González  started his professional career at Caracas, and made his debut as a right back in the year 2010 by coach Noel Sanvicente.

During the 2010/2011 he became a regular and scored 4 goals, playing the season as a right midfielder and  right back. In the Copa Libertadores 2011, he played the 6 games of the Group Stage where his team was eliminated in the final match against Vélez Sarsfield. After a successful season, he won the Best Young Player In Venezuela 2010/11 Season award.

BSC Young Boys
It was announced that on January 3, 2012 Alexander would go to BSC Young Boys. He made his debut with the Swiss team on 25 March 2012 with a 4–0 win against FC Thun.

He scored his first goal for the club on 5 May 2012 against FC Luzern. He scored for the first time in Europe competition on 6 December 2012 against Anzhi Makhachkala in the UEFA Europa League 2012/13 season .

FC Aarau & FC Thun loans
On 1 July 2013, Gonzalez became a member of newly promoted Super League club FC Aarau. Where he played 27 games before joining FC Thun on loan in the summer of 2014.

Huesca
On 31 January 2016, it was announced that González had agreed to an 18-month contract with SD Huesca in Segunda División. On 30 August 2017, he renewed his contract for a further year.

Elche / Mirandés
On 4 August 2018, free agent González signed for Elche CF also in the Spanish second division. On 26 August of the following year, he joined fellow league team CD Mirandés also on a one-year deal.

Dinamo Bucharest
In September 2020, González signed a two-year contract with Romanian side Dinamo București. After only three months, he ended his contract with the Liga I club.

Málaga
On 28 December 2020, free agent González returned to the Spanish second division with Málaga CF, after agreeing to a contract until 30 June 2021.

Pyunik
On 3 February 2022, Pyunik announced the signing of González.

Caracas return
On 9 February 2023, González returned to his first club Caracas.

International career
González made his debut for Venezuela in 2009. He was also part of the Venezuela squad who reached 4th place in the 2011 Copa America.

González was also part of the Venezuela squad for the Copa América Centenario, which saw Venezuela knocked out of the quarter finals after a 4–1 loss against Argentina including 2 goals from Lionel Messi for Argentina.

Career statistics

Club

International

International goals 
Scores and results list Venezuela's goal tally first.

Honours
Pyunik
 Armenian Premier League: 2021–22

References

External links

1992 births
Living people
Venezuelan footballers
Association football defenders
Caracas FC players
BSC Young Boys players
FC Aarau players
FC Thun players
SD Huesca footballers
Elche CF players
CD Mirandés footballers
FC Dinamo București players
Málaga CF players
Venezuelan Primera División players
Swiss Super League players
Segunda División players
Liga I players
2011 Copa América players
Copa América Centenario players
2021 Copa América players
Venezuela international footballers
Venezuela under-20 international footballers
Venezuelan expatriate footballers
Venezuelan expatriate sportspeople in Switzerland
Venezuelan expatriate sportspeople in Spain
Venezuelan expatriate sportspeople in Romania
Expatriate footballers in Switzerland
Expatriate footballers in Spain
Expatriate footballers in Romania